WRLU (104.1 FM) is a radio station  broadcasting a mainstream country format. Licensed to serve Algoma, Wisconsin, United States, the station serves the Door and Kewaunee county area.  The station is currently owned by Bryan Mazur, through licensee Mazur, LLC.

References

External links

RLU
Radio stations established in 1999
1999 establishments in Wisconsin
Country radio stations in the United States